Andrey Krivenok is a retired Soviet and Ukrainian football player.

Player Career
Serhiy Melnichenko started his career in 1985 with Desna Chernihiv, the main club in the city of Chernihiv where he played 8 matches.  In 1988 he moved to Ghidroteksyl Chernihiv and in 1989 he moved to Turtkulchi Turtkul where he played 11 matches. In 1990 he returned Desna Chernihiv where he played until 1997 where he played 236 matches and scored 19 goals. Here he won the Ukrainian Second League in season 1996–97. In 1997 he moved back to Cheksyl Chernihiv without playing and then he moved Fortuna Cheksyl Chernihiv where he played 8 matches and scored 10 goals. In the same season he moved to Domostroitel Chernihiv where he played 6 matches and scored 2 goals.

Coach Career
In 2004 he was appointed as coach of Desna-2 Chernihiv, the reserve squad of Desna Chernihiv.

Honours
Desna Chernihiv
 Ukrainian Second League: 1996–97

References

External links 
 Andrey Krivenok at footballfacts.ru

1967 births
Living people
Soviet footballers
Footballers from Chernihiv
FC Desna Chernihiv players
FC Cheksyl Chernihiv players
FC Desna-2 Chernihiv managers
Ukrainian footballers
Ukrainian Second League players
Association football midfielders